Taylor High School is a public high school located in Taylor, Texas, United States. It is part of the Taylor Independent School District located in east central Williamson County and classified as a 4A school by the University Interscholastic League (UIL).  In 2015, the school was rated "Met Standard" by the Texas Education Agency.

Athletics
The Taylor Ducks compete in these sports - 

Cross Country, Volleyball, Football, Basketball, Powerlifting, Soccer, Golf, Tennis, Track, Softball & Baseball

State titles
Taylor (UIL)

Baseball - 
1969(3A), 1972(3A)
Boys Track - 
1961(2A), 1966(2A)

Taylor Price (PVIL)

Football - 
1947(PVIL-1A)^, 1962(PVIL-1A)
^Co-champions

State finalists
Taylor (UIL)

Baseball - 
1971(3A)

Taylor Hughes (PVIL)

Boys Basketball - 
1966 (PVIL-1A)

Notable alumni
 Dicky Moegle, former NFL player
 Les Peterson, former NFL player
 Fred Kerley, Sprinter, Silver medalist at the 2020 Tokyo Olympics (held in July/August 2021).
 Rip Torn, actor

References

External links
 
Taylor ISD

High schools in Williamson County, Texas
Public high schools in Texas